Songhai may refer to:

People
 Songhai people, an ethnic group of western Africa
 Songhai proper, a subgroup of the Songhai people 
 Safiya Songhai (born 1984), American film director

Other uses
 Songhai Empire, a former country
 The Songhai, a geographic area in Niger
 Songhai or Songhay languages, a group of closely related languages
 Songhai (album), a 1988 fusion flamenco album by Spanish band Ketama
 Songhai (musical collaboration), a world music group including the band Ketama
 Songhoy Blues, a desert blues music group from Mali

Language and nationality disambiguation pages